SAMOS-F or Air Force Program 102 refers to a series of SIGINT reconnaissance satellites launched and operated by the United States Air Force and National Reconnaissance Office during the 1960s. Initial priorities (in decreasing order) were to monitor radio waves in the frequency bands 2.5-3.2 GHz (S band), 9.0-10 GHz (X band), and 59-650 MHz. The intercepted data and their location were stored on magnetic tape, and subsequently transmitted to tracking and acquisition ground stations. Tracking stations were located in the NE (New Boston, New Hampshire), Central (Ottumwa, Iowa), and NW (Fort Stevens (Oregon)) of the continental United States, with additional test sites at Vandenberg AFB, California, and at Ka'ena Point, Oahu, Hawai. The satellites are also called Agena ferrets and heavy ferrets. Approximately sixteen heavy ferrets were launched into low Earth orbits from Vandenberg Air Force Base between February 1962 and July 1971 aboard Thor-Agena and Thorad-Agena rockets. Almost everything about these satellites remains classified.

Launch list

References
SAMOS F2 and SAMOS F3 from Gunter's space page
SAMOS from Jonathan McDowell
Dwayne Day, "Ferrets above: American signals intelligence satellites during the 1960s"  International Journal of Intelligence and Counterintelligence, 17 no. 3. p449-467 (2004)

Signals intelligence satellites
Reconnaissance satellites of the United States
Satellite series
Military equipment introduced in the 1960s